Galactic is a funk and jazz jam band from New Orleans.

Galactic may also refer to:

Galactic, pertaining to the Milky Way galaxy
Galactic, pertaining to a galaxy
Galactic, a company based in Anderlecht, Belgium, which manufactures the bioplastic polylactic acid from sugar beet
Virgin Galactic, whose callsign is "GALACTIC"
Galactic-class battle carrier, a class of fictional spacecraft from Star Wars
Team Galactic, a fictional villainous team from Pokémon Diamond and Pearl, and Pokémon Platinum
 Galactic Space Alliance, a galactic polity found in Power Rangers: Lost Galaxy

See also
Galaxy (disambiguation)
Galactic core (disambiguation)
Galactic Center (disambiguation)
Galactic Empire (disambiguation)
Galactic Federation (disambiguation)
Galactic Union (disambiguation)
Galactic Alliance (disambiguation)
Galactic republic (disambiguation)
Galaxian (disambiguation)
Battlestar Galactica (disambiguation)
 Galactic Space Alliance, a galactic polity found in Power Rangers: Lost Galaxy